Pardosa pseudostrigillata is a wolf spider species in the genus Pardosa found in Austria, Italy and Slovenia.

See also 
 List of Lycosidae species

References

External links 

pseudostrigillata
Spiders of Europe
Spiders described in 1966